The Omar Sultan Foundation is a Bangladeshi charitable organization that offers scholarships to underprivileged and meritorious students across the country.

The foundation extends its support to top-ranked Bangladeshi Universities for better and quality education and also helps the underprivileged students of Bangladesh. The United College of Aviation, Science & Management is one of the sister concerns of this foundation.

History 
The foundation was established by Chondonaish Thana in Alhaz M Nurul Amin, Bangladesh. Its mission was to create a digital Bangladesh and promote it as a skilled and efficient nation.

Omar Sultan Foundation Computer Lab at Faculty of Business Studies, Dhaka University and Omar Sultan Dental Department at USTC Chittagong received donations from this foundation.

Activities 

 Micro Credit Program: help the economic development of villages.
 Students Micro Credit Program: help poor, meritorious students
 Youth Development Project: help jobless youth in becoming independent
 Scholarships: offer scholarships to intelligent students who cannot afford education
 Vocational Training: arrange vocational training to the generation of fully or semi-educated young children who remain jobless. 
 Medical Services: support health services are available for people with lesser incomes.
 Establishes import-based industries for rural people.

See also
 Islamic Foundation Bangladesh
 Grameen Foundation
 JAAGO Foundation

References

Foundations based in Bangladesh